USS Arcady (SP-577) was a United States Navy patrol vessel in commission from 1917 to 1919.

Arcady was built as the private steam yacht Osceola by Samuel H. Pine at New York City. She later was renamed Arcady.

On 28 May 1917, the U.S. Navy purchased Arcady from her owner, Arthur Meeker of Beverly, Massachusetts, for use as a section patrol vessel during World War I. She was commissioned at Boston, Massachusetts, as USS Arcady (SP-577) on 8 June 1917.

Initially assigned to the 1st Naval District in northern New England, Arcady acted as duty and guard boat at the Boston Navy Yard in Boston. She also conducted patrols off Provincetown, Massachusetts, and near the Cape Cod Canal.

In October 1918, Arcady was reassigned to the 2nd Naval District in southern New England, where she performed patrol duty from her base at Submarine Base New London at New London, Connecticut, through the end of World War I and into the spring of 1919.

In April 1919, Arcady moved to New York City, where she was decommissioned at the Marine Basin on 12 May 1919. She was stricken from the Navy List on 17 May 1919 sold to Mr. C. R. Stewart of Arlington, New Jersey, on 20 September 1919.

References

Department of the Navy Naval History and Heritage Command Online Library of Selected Images: Civilian Ships: Arcady (American Steam Yacht, 1898). Served as USS Arcady (SP-577) in 1917–1919
NavSource Online: Section Patrol Craft Photo Archive: Arcady (SP 577)

Patrol vessels of the United States Navy
World War I patrol vessels of the United States
Ships built in New York City
1898 ships
Individual yachts